Klawer is a town in the Matzikama Municipality in the Western Cape province of South Africa. According to the 2011 census it has a population of 6,234 people in 1,680 households. Then name Klawer comes from the Afrikaans word for a type of wild clover which grows here after the rains.

References

Populated places in the Matzikama Local Municipality